Franz Wilhelm Neger (2 June 1868, Nuremberg – 6 May 1923, Dresden) was a German botanist, mycologist and dendrologist.

He studied chemistry and natural sciences at the University of Munich, where his influences included Adolf von Baeyer and Paul Groth. From 1893 he taught classes in natural sciences at the "German college" in Concepción, Chile, during which time, he conducted botanical and mycological research in the Andes and Patagonia as well as in areas in the vicinity of Concepción.

In 1897 he returned to Europe as a chemistry assistant at the industrial school in Munich. During the following year he taught classes in chemistry and sciences at a secondary school in Wunsiedel, and in 1899 became a custodian at the botanical museum in Munich. In 1902 he received his habilitation under the sponsorship of Karl Ritter von Goebel and Ludwig Radlkofer. Afterwards, he worked as a professor at the forest academies in Eisenach (from 1902) and Tharandt (1905–20), and in the meantime, took research trips to southern Spain (1907), Dalmatia (1909), Corsica (1911) and Sweden (several times). In 1920 he was named director of the botanical institute and gardens at the polytechnic institute in Dresden.

The mycological genera Negeriella (Henn., 1897) and Mikronegeria (Dietel, 1899) are named after him, as is the ambrosia fungus Wolfgangiella franznegeri (C. Mayers, T.C. Harr. & Roets, 2019).

Selected works 
 Beiträge zur Biologie der Erysipheen, 1901 – Contribution to the biology of Erysiphe.
 Die Handelspflanzen Deutschlands : ihre Verbreitung, wirtschaftliche Bedeutung und technische Verwendung, 1904 – Commercial plants of Germany; distribution, economic importance and technical use. 
 Die Nadelhölzer (Koniferen) und übrigen Gymnospermen, 1907 – Softwoods (conifers) and other gymnosperms. 
 Chilenisch-patagonische Charakterpflanzen, 1908 – Chilean-Patagonian plant characteristics. 
 Biologie der pflanzen auf experimenteller grundlage (bionomie), 1913 – Biology of plants on an experimental basis (bionomics).
 Die Laubhölzer kurzgefaßte Beschreibung der in Mitteleuropa gedeihenden Laubbäume und Sträucher, 1914 – Hardwoods summary and description of central European deciduous trees and shrubs. 
 Die Krankheiten unserer Waldbäume und wichtigsten Gartengehölze, 1919 – Diseases of forest trees and primary garden trees.

References 

1868 births
1923 deaths
Scientists from Nuremberg
Ludwig Maximilian University of Munich alumni
19th-century German botanists
German mycologists
Dendrologists
20th-century German botanists